Karas or Kuih Karas is one of the famous traditional food in Kedah. It is usually found in Kota Setar District. it suitable to eat during tea time with a cup of hot coffee
 
Aasmi traditional Sri Lankan delicacy that is prepared during Sinhalese new year .

Kuih Karas also can be found in Borneo Island (Sabah, Sarawak and Brunei). This cake is a traditional cake made from rice flour.  This cake is looks like a net and uses a mold to make it. It also tastes sweet and crunchy.

See also

 Cuisine of Malaysia

References

External links
 Kuih Karas: Cara lama untuk keaslian rasa

Malay cuisine
Snack foods